This is a list of the heritage sites in Worcester, Western Cape as recognised by the South African Heritage Resources Agency.

|}

References 

Western Cape-related lists
Tourist attractions in the Western Cape
Worcester